The Qatar national football team nicknamed The Maroons, represents Qatar in international football, and is controlled by the Qatar Football Association and AFC. They play their home games at Khalifa International Stadium and Jassim Bin Hamad Stadium. The latter is considered the home stadium. Qatar is a member of both the FIFA and the Asian Football Confederation (AFC).

The team won the Arabian Gulf Cup in 1992, 2004 and 2014. They have appeared in ten Asian Cup tournaments and won it once in 2019, beating Japan, Saudi Arabia, and South Korea in the process, conceding just one goal. 

Qatar hosted the 2022 FIFA World Cup and therefore qualified automatically for what was their first appearance in the finals. It was the first time an Arab nation hosted the competition. On 26 November 2022, Qatar were the first team to be eliminated from the World Cup; subsequently, they became the worst performing host nation in the history of the FIFA World Cup, not winning a single game.

Qatar has footballing rivalries with Bahrain, United Arab Emirates, and Saudi Arabia.

History

Pre-1970
Football was brought to Qatar during a time which coincided with initial discovery of oil reserves in Dukhan in 1940. By 1948, expatriate oil workers played the first official football match in Qatar. The Qatar Football Association was formed in 1960, and the QFA joined FIFA in 1963. Simultaneously during this period, the Bahrain Football Association were drawing up plans for the establishment of a regional football competition within the GCC and Qatari officials were involved with the corroboration of this proposal. The plans came to fruition and in March 1970 the Arabian Gulf Cup was inaugurated.

1970–1980
The Qatar national team played its first official match on 27 March 1970 against hosts Bahrain, losing 1–2 as Mubarak Faraj scored the sole goal for Qatar. The newly formed Qatar national team posted underwhelming results in the first Gulf Cup tournament, coming in last place with a single point, with the highlight of their tournament being a 1–1 draw with the Saudis in their final match.

In the next edition of the Gulf Cup in 1972, Qatar was again relegated to last place after suffering 3 straight defeats. The next tournament in 1974 proved to be somewhat of a break-through for the Qataris as they achieved their first triumph in international football with a 4–0 victory over Oman. The Qataris lost out to Saudi Arabia in the semi-finals, but achieved a 3rd place standing after emerging the victors of a penalty shoot-out against the United Arab Emirates.

The first time they entered the qualifying stages for the AFC Asian Cup was in 1975. They were not successful in qualifying for the 1976 Asian Cup, with Iraq and Saudi Arabia booking the group's two qualifying berths. Despite this setback, Qatar finished in 3rd place in the 1976 Gulf Cup as the host nation the next year.

The national team played its first FIFA World Cup qualifying match in 1977. Qatar was set to play the United Arab Emirates on 11 March 1977, but the last minute withdrawal of the Emirati team from the competition merely postponed Qatar's debut until two days later when Bahrain were defeated 2–0 in Doha.

1980–1990
Their Asian Cup debut came in 1980 under head coach Evaristo de Macedo. They had qualified for the tournament after topping a relatively easy group composing of Bangladesh and Afghanistan. Their showing in the main tournament was unimpressive, making an early exit from the group stages with two defeats, one draw and one win.

Qatar narrowly lost to Iraq in the finals of the 1984 Gulf Cup, nonetheless they were named runners-up, their most impressive accolade until 1992.

They failed to make it out of the preliminary stages of the 1982 and 1986 World Cup qualifying rounds. However, the team qualified for both the 1984 and 1988 editions of the Asian Cup. They fell short of qualifying for the semi-finals of the 1984 tournament, with Saudi Arabia's Mohaisen Al-Jam'an's 88th-minute goal against Kuwait ensuring a semi-final position for both teams. They also missed out on a semi-final place in 1988; however, they notably defeated Japan by a score of 3–0.

1990–2000
Qatar arguably reached its peak in the 1990s, attaining its highest-ever FIFA rating (53) in August 1993. Qatar started off with an emphatic qualifying campaign for the 1990 World Cup, finishing at the top of their group. They were denied a spot in the World Cup after finishing below the United Arab Emirates and South Korea in the final round of the qualifiers.

In 1990, the national team once again finished runners-up in the Gulf Cup as Kuwait won the final two matches of the tournament. Two years later, they won the competition on home soil for the first time under the leadership of Sebastião Lapola, despite a 1–0 loss against Saudi Arabia in their final game. They were also named runners-up in the 1996 Gulf Cup.

Qatar reached the Asian Zone's final qualifying round for France 1998. After wins against China and Iran, they played their last match against Saudi Arabia, where a victory would have earned qualification. However, they lost out as Saudi Arabia won 1–0 to reach the finals.

As 1998 Arab Cup hosts, they finished runners-up to Saudi Arabia.

2000–2010
They made it to the quarter-finals of the 2000 Asian Cup despite finishing 3rd in their group, but lost to China in their quarter-final confrontation.

They reached the final qualifying round again in 2001 but were defeated by Bora Milutinovic's China team, who topped the section to progress to their first FIFA World Cup. Frenchman Philippe Troussier took the manager's job after the 2002 World Cup in Korea and Japan, but was unsuccessful in both the 2004 Asian Cup and the qualifying campaign for the 2006 World Cup in Germany.

Troussier was sacked after the World Cup qualifying campaign, and under Bosnian Džemaludin Mušović, the team won the Gulf Cup in 2004 and the Asian Games gold in 2006. Mušović stepped down after Qatar only earned two points from three matches in the 2007 Asian Cup.

The job of coaching the team in qualifying for the 2010 World Cup fell to Jorge Fossati, who led the team throughout the first and second AFC rounds up to the third round. After leaving them at the top of their group with only two played matches, Fossati had to undergo stomach surgery. Subsequently, the Qatar Football Association ended their cooperation with him in September 2008, as the QFA claimed he needed too long to recover from surgery. Bruno Metsu was called up for the job, but Qatar failed to qualify after finishing fourth in their qualifying group.

2010–2020

Qatar was announced as hosts of the 2022 FIFA World Cup in December 2010. 

In 2011, as hosts of the 2011 Asian Cup, they advanced to the quarter-finals. They succumbed to a late 2–3 defeat to eventual champions Japan after a goal was scored by Masahiko Inoha in the 89th minute.

Also as hosts, they went on to win the 2013 WAFF Championship after defeating Jordan 2–0 in the final. The competition was made up primarily of youth and reserve teams, of which Qatar's was the latter. Djamel Belmadi, the head coach of the B team, replaced Fahad Thani as the head coach of the senior team as a result of the team's positive performances. 10 months later, Djamel Belmadi led Qatar to gold in the 2014 Gulf Cup. They advanced from the group stages after three draws, going on to defeat Oman 3–1 in the semi-final, and were victorious in the final against Saudi Arabia, who was playing in front of a home crowd, by a margin of 2–1.

Despite winning the Gulf Cup and finishing the year 2014 with only one defeat, Qatar showed poor form in the 2015 Asian Cup. Qatar was defeated 1–4 by the United Arab Emirates in their opener. This was continued with a 0–1 loss to Iran and 1–2 to Bahrain. Qatar was eliminated in the group stages with no points and placed 4th in Group C.

Qatar's campaign in qualifying for the 2018 World Cup in Russia was a surprise. Their start in the second round of World Cup qualifying in the AFC was nearly perfect, with seven wins and only one loss. However, their success in the second round didn't follow them to the third round. Qatar finished bottom of their group, ensuring they would play their first World Cup match on home soil in 2022, the first team to do so since Italy in 1934.

Qatar continued its poor form in the 2017 Gulf Cup, which was hosted by Kuwait. Qatar opened the tournament with a 4–0 win against Yemen, but that was followed by a 1–2 loss to Iraq and an unconvincing 1–1 draw to Bahrain. Qatar took third place in Group B with four points and was eliminated in the group stage of the competition, which was considered an upsetting of the tournament, especially after winning the 2014 edition.

However, Qatar had an excellent campaign at the 2019 Asian Cup. Their opener saw them defeat Lebanon 2–0. This was followed by a 6–0 thrashing of North Korea and a 2–0 win against three-time champions Saudi Arabia, which sealed the team getting first place in the group. They had a 1–0 win against Iraq in the Round of 16 and a late win against defending runners-up South Korea in the quarter-finals, seeing them through to the semi-finals for the first time ever, where they defeated the hosts United Arab Emirates 4–0 to set up a final against 4-time winners Japan. Qatar ended up winning the final 3–1 over Japan, marking their first-ever major tournament title in their history, and capping off one of the most improbable Asian Cup runs in the tournament's history, especially since they conceded only one goal in all their games.	

Qatar was invited to the 2019 Copa América. They were placed in Group B with Colombia, Argentina and Paraguay. Their first game was against Paraguay where they came back from a 2–0 deficit to tie it 2–2 but marked for the first time Qatar suffered more than one goal in any major competition since winning the Asian Cup in UAE. It was followed by a 0–1 loss to Colombia, ending the team's undefeated streak in any major competition to eight. A 0–2 loss to Argentina meant Qatar took the last place in Group B with a single point and was eliminated in the group stage of the competition.

2020–present
Qatar was invited for the first time to the 2021 CONCACAF Gold Cup. They played in Group D with Honduras, Panama and Grenada.

In December 2020, UEFA invited Qatar to play friendlies against the teams in Group A of the 2022 World Cup qualifying group – Azerbaijan, Luxembourg, Portugal, the Republic of Ireland and Serbia – as five teams in one group means one team will not be playing on any given match day. These friendlies did not count in the qualifying group standings. Qatar played their "home" matches in Europe in order to allow short travel times for their opponents.

In the 2021 CONCACAF Gold Cup, Qatar claimed 7 points in Group D. Their debut was against Panama with a 3–3 draw, ensuring them their first point. This was followed by a 4–0 victory over Grenada and a 2–0 win over Honduras ensuring a quarter-final place where they would face El Salvador, ultimately securing a semi-final place against the United States with a 3–2 win. However, against the hosts with its squad made up of the majority of MLS players, Qatar failed to find the way to the net, in spite of having a penalty in the 60th minute, ultimately conceding a late goal from Gyasi Zardes to end Qatar's campaign with a 1–0 loss. 

In the 2021 FIFA Arab Cup, Qatar won all of its group-stage matches and faced UAE, winning 5–0. They lost 2–1 in the semi-final against Algeria, eventually placing 3rd.

Despite the very successful performance of Qatar in various major tournaments, the 2022 FIFA World Cup held at home proved to be a nightmare for the Qataris. Being automatically drawn into the Group A as hosts, Qatar started with a 0–2 loss to Ecuador in the opening match, conceding two goals in the first half from Enner Valencia, making Qatar the first host country to lose their opening game. The situation did not improve for the Qataris in their second meeting with Senegal, when the Africans beat the Qataris 3–1 to condemn the hosts to an early World Cup exit, the second hosts after South Africa to have such an unwanted record, although Ghanaian-born Mohammed Muntari became Qatar's first World Cup scorer in this game. With Qatar's elimination confirmed, the hosts then fell to the Netherlands 0–2, making an unwanted record as the first hosts to score the least amount of goals (1), the first to lose all three group games, the first to be eliminated after two group games (South Africa, as hosts of the 2010 FIFA World Cup, were eliminated only on goal differences to Mexico after three matches) and the lowest-ranked team in the tournament (ranked 32nd).

Team image

Kits and crest
 
Qatar wears all-maroon as their home colours and all-white colours as an away kit. Their first manufacturer was Umbro from 1984 to 1989. All Qatar kits are currently manufactured by Nike.

Rivalries

Bahrain 

Qatar has a major rivalry against Bahrain due to historical tension between the two countries. With 39 matches played, the overall record favours Bahrain, who won 11 matches, lost 8, and tied 19. From 2004 until 2021, Qatar suffered a winless streak over Bahrain with six defeats and ten draws before finally registering a win in the 2021 FIFA Arab Cup.

United Arab Emirates 

The rivalry with United Arab Emirates is a competitive one in the Arabian Gulf Cup meeting in multiple occasions, due to the 2017–2021 Qatar diplomatic crisis, increasing tensions had been witnessed, with the captain of UAE under-19 youth team refusing to shake hands with Qatar's youth captain in 2018 AFC U-19 Championship held in Indonesia; in this tournament, the UAE beat Qatar 2–1 but still crashed out from the group stage while Qatar would recover to qualify for the 2019 FIFA U-20 World Cup. As of 2020, Qatar and UAE have played 31 official matches, most of which was held competitively in the Arabian Gulf Cup, it started off with the United Arab Emirates beating Qatar 1–0. They only played 2 friendly games and the last friendly was held in 2011 which ended with an Emirati victory. In the 2019 AFC Asian Cup, hosted by the UAE, Qatar overran the UAE for the first time since 2001 with a result of 4–0, with heavy tensions occurring between the two teams and Emirati supporters cheering anti-Qatari chants.

Saudi Arabia 

Qatar has a major rivalry against Saudi Arabia due to historical tension between the two countries and the 2017–2021 Qatar diplomatic crisis. Qatar has an overall negative record against Saudi Arabia; with 41 matches played, Qatar has won 8 matches, lost 17, and tied 16.

Results and fixtures

The following are Qatar's results in the last 12 months and upcoming fixtures.

Legend

2022

2023

Coaching staff

Coaching history

Caretaker managers are listed in italics.

 Taha Toukhi (1969)
 Mohammed Hassan Kheiri (1969–1972)
 Helmi Hussein Mahmoud (1974)
 Frank Wignall (1975–1977)
 John Carrdone (1977–1978)
 Hassan Othman (1979)
 Evaristo de Macedo (1979–1984)
 Ronald de Carvalho (1984)
 Evaristo de Macedo (1984–1985)
 Dino Sani &  Júlio Espinosa (1985–1986)
 Procópio Cardoso (1987–1988)
 Anatoliy Prokopenko (1988)
 Mohammed Daham (1988)
 Cabralzinho (1989)
 Dino Sani (1989–1990)
 Uli Maslo (1990)
 Dino Sani (1990)
 Luís Fernandes (1992)
 Evaristo de Macedo (1992)
 Ivo Wortmann (1992)
 Sebastião Lapola (1992–1993)
 Abdul Mallalah (1993)
 Dave Mackay (1994–1995)
 Jørgen E. Larsen (1995–1996)
 Jo Bonfrère (1996–1997)
 Džemal Hadžiabdić (1997–1998)
 Zé Mario (1998)
 Luiz Gonzaga Milioli (1998)
 Jo Bonfrère (1998–1999)
 Džemal Hadžiabdić (1999–2001)
 Paulo Luiz Campos (2001)
 Pierre Lechantre (2002–2003)
 Philippe Troussier (2003–2004)
 Saeed Al Misnad (2004)
 Džemal Hadžiabdić (2004–2007)
 Jorge Fossati (2007–2008)
 Bruno Metsu (2008–2011)
 Milovan Rajevac (2011)
 Sebastião Lazaroni (2011–2012)
 Paulo Autuori (2012–2013)
 Fahad Thani (2013–2014)
 Djamel Belmadi (2014–2015)
 José Daniel Carreño (2015–2016) 
 Jorge Fossati (2016–2017)
 Félix Sánchez (2017–2022)
 Bruno Pinheiro (2022–2023)
 Carlos Queiroz (2023–present)

Players

Current squad
The following 23 players were called up for the 25th Arabian Gulf Cup.
 Match date: 7 – 16 January 2023
 Caps and goals correct as of 16 January, after the match against Iraq.

Recent call-ups
The following players have also been called up to the Qatar squad within the last 12 months.

COV Player withdrew from the squad due to contracting COVID-19.
INJ Player withdrew from the squad due to an injury.
PRE Preliminary squad.
RET Retired from the national team.
SUS Player is serving a suspension.
WD Player withdrew from the squad due to non-injury issue.

Naturalised players
While it is reasonably common for footballers to represent national teams other than their birth nations, the nature and extent of the practice for the Qatari team have been the subject of scrutiny and criticism at various points during the 21st century. In 2004, FIFA cited the intention of three Brazilian players – Aílton, Dedé and Leandro – to play for the Qatar national team as the immediate trigger to their decision to tighten eligibility rules to ensure players have ties to the country they represent.

Qatar continued to pursue a strategy of naturalizing foreign-born players, within the limitations of the new rules, and it continued to prove controversial. The "Aspire Football Dreams" program of recruitment of boys from Africa to an academy in Qatar drew a substantial amount of criticism. While Qatari authorities described it as a humanitarian effort and a way to provide competition for native Qatari players, critics claimed that it was merely another exploitative way of acquiring naturalized players, with Vice linking it to human rights abuses and the kafala system. The International Labour Organization (ILO) and Qatar announced the removal of the Kafala on 12 December 2016; the law came into effect in 2018. The reform took place between UN’s International labor organization and the state of Qatar and was proven to be the part of many said assurances that nation has claimed for the 2022 World Cup. Though claimed by independent bodies of Qatar foundering to achieve the same, both sides had agreed to revise previous acts that had been taken. To make this all possible, the hosting country declared to pay compensation for the deaths of its migrant workers on 12 August 2022.

Job changes between September 2020 and March 2022, the establishment of a nondiscriminatory wage system for all workers in March 2021, and workers' funds and insurance policies in the workplace are all data that showcased the functioning of the state for its workers. 

In the 2015 friendly against Algeria, six of the eleven players in the starting team were born outside of Qatar. Then-president of FIFA, Sepp Blatter, warned Qatar that FIFA would monitor their player selection to ensure that they were not relying too heavily on naturalised players. He made comparisons to the Qatar men's national handball team, referring to the team's selection for the 2015 World Men's Handball Championship as an "absurdity". The following year, naturalized players formed the backbone of the team and were sufficiently integral that head coach Jorge Fossati threatened to resign if they were removed.

The reliance on naturalised players has subsequently reduced, with only two members of the squad that beat Switzerland in a 2018 friendly being born outside Qatar. However, at the 2019 Asian Cup, amidst diplomatic tensions between the two countries, the United Arab Emirates Football Association lodged a formal complaint against Qatar, alleging that Almoez Ali and Bassam Al-Rawi were not eligible to play for them. These complaints were dismissed by the AFC.

Of the 26 players called up to the 2022 FIFA World Cup, 10 players were born outside of Qatar.

Player records

Players in bold text are still active with Qatar.

Competitive record

 Champion   Runners-up   Third place

FIFA World Cup

AFC Asian Cup

FIFA Arab Cup

Copa América

Qatar was the second team from outside the Americas to participate in the Copa América, and were invited for the first time in 2019.

CONCACAF Gold Cup

Qatar was the second team from Asia to participate in the CONCACAF Gold Cup, and were invited for the first time in 2021.

Gulf Cup

The Gulf Cup has been played on a bi-annual basis since 1970. The tournament has changed since the first edition from a round-robin basis to a knockout tournament in the latter years. Notably, the 2000 edition was cancelled and the 2003 and 2010 were moved due to congested fixture lists with other tournaments, such as the Asian Cup.

Pan Arab Games

WAFF Championship

Olympic Games

Asian Games

Head-to-head record
 Source:

The following table shows Qatar's all-time international record, correct as of 24 February 2023. The last match was played against  on 16 January 2023.

Honours

Major
 AFC Asian Cup
Winners (1): 2019
 Arabian Gulf Cup
Winners (3): 1992, 2004, 2014

 WAFF Championship
Winners (1): 2014

 Football at the Asian Games
Winners (1): 2006

Minor
 International Friendship Championship
Winners (1): 2018

See also
Sport in Qatar
Football in Qatar
Women's football in Qatar
Qatar Football Association
Qatar national under-23 football team (aka Qatar Olympic team)
Qatar national under-20 football team
Qatar national under-17 football team
Qatar women's national football team

References

External links

 Qatar Football Association (official website)
 Qatar – FIFA profile
Qatar – NFT profile

 

 
AFC Asian Cup-winning countries
Asian national association football teams
National sports teams established in 1970
1970 establishments in Qatar